Laura Czarnotta (born 9 August 1990) is a Polish former competitive figure skater. She competed for three seasons on the ISU Junior Grand Prix circuit and twice at the World Junior Figure Skating Championships, qualifying for the free skate in 2006. 

She started skating at the age of 7 in Germany and continued in Warsaw, where she moved three years later. She trained at Warsaw's Marymont Skating Club until November 2007 when she moved to Katowice.

Programs

Competitive highlights 
JGP: Junior Grand Prix

References

External links

 
 Laura Czarnotta at Tracings.net

Polish female single skaters
Polish expatriate sportspeople in Germany
Citizens of Poland through descent
1990 births
Living people
Sportspeople from Mannheim